Gath is a surname that may refer to
Alfredo Gath (1852–1936), Argentine businessman, co-founder of Gath & Chaves
Conor Gath (born 1980), Irish hurler
Kulan Gath, fictional character in Marvel Comics
Mikael Gath (born 1976), Swedish ice hockey player 
Yoav Gath (born 1980), Israeli Olympic swimmer
 The pen name of journalist George Alfred Townsend